The men's Greco-Roman 66 kilograms at the 2004 Summer Olympics as part of the wrestling program were held at the Ano Liosia Olympic Hall, August 24 to August 25.

The competition held with an elimination system of three or four wrestlers in each pool, with the winners qualifying for the quarterfinals, semifinals and the final by way of direct elimination.

Schedule
All times are Eastern European Summer Time (UTC+03:00)

Results 
Legend
D — Disqualified
F — Won by fall

Elimination pools

Pool 1

Pool 2

Pool 3

Pool 4

Pool 5

Pool 6

Knockout round

Final standing

 Manuchar Kvirkvelia was disqualified for unsportsmanlike conduct following the end of his first round bout with Şeref Eroğlu.
 Kim In-sub and Parviz Zeidvand were both disqualified after they failed to appear for the fifth place match.

References
Official Report

Greco-Roman 66 kg
Men's events at the 2004 Summer Olympics